Women of the World Festival (WOW, WOW Festival) is an annual arts and science festival based in London, that celebrates the achievements of women and girls, as well as looking at the obstacles they face across the world. As a global feminist movement, it seeks to inspire new generations of young women and girls.

History

The festival was founded in 2010 by Jude Kelly, a theatre director who was at that time artistic director of London's Southbank Centre.

Since 2015 Queen Camilla has been WOW's president. In 2015, the BBC streamed much of the London festival's content. By 2018, there were 42 WOW festivals in 23 countries.

The WOW Foundation was incorporated in 2018, with Kelly as its first director. She stepped down from her position at the Southbank Centre in May 2018, in order to concentrate on WOW.

In 2020, the festival's tenth edition featured an address by Camilla (then Duchess of Cornwall). In May of that year, the WOW Foundation ran a two-day online event in partnership with BBC Arts.

In March 2021, as the effects of the COVID-19 pandemic continued to be felt, the festival moved online.

Description
The WOW Festival takes place over several days in early March, around International Women's Day. WOW sponsors lectures, debates, performances and mentoring sessions on a range of themes and topics.

Recognition
The Southbank Centre has been listed in The Times Top 50 employers for women. Its Women of the World festival was nominated for two awards as part of the Business in the Community Workplace Gender Equality Awards 2016.

Venues
The festival's principal venue is the Southbank Centre in London, where it was founded. There have been and/or still are satellite venues at many other locations, both within the UK and throughout the world.  these included Cambridge, England, Liverpool, Cardiff, New York City, Rio de Janeiro, Hargeysa (Somaliland), Alexandria, Finland, Beijing, and several locations in Australia.

Australia
WOW Australia has been based in Brisbane, Queensland, since 2021, as a three-year collaboration between Southbank Centre/WOW Foundation and the non-profit Of One Mind, and supported by the Queensland Government. WOW has worked with Aboriginal and Torres Strait Islander women and is a supporter of the Uluru Statement from the Heart.

See also
 Being a Man Festival

References

External links
 

Recurring events established in 2010
Women's events
Gender and education
Women's festivals
Festivals in London
Women in London